Măru Roșu may refer to several villages in Romania:

 Măru Roșu, a village in the town of Însurăței, Brăila County
 Măru Roșu, a village in Corcova Commune, Mehedinți County

See also 
 Măru (disambiguation)